Renea moutonii singularis is a subspecies of land snail with an operculum, a terrestrial gastropod mollusk in the family Aciculidae. It was described by Pollonera in 1905.  The common name is needle snail.

Distribution

This subspecies is endemic to France. It has a very narrow distribution, being found only in the Alpes-Maritimes, in the Loup and Siagne valleys. Because of its limited distribution and rarity within its range it is considered threatened. The IUCN red list of endangered species lists it as vulnerable.

Description

These snails are between 3 and 4 mm long and 1.1 to 1.3 mm wide. Their elongated shells are light brown with fine ribbing (60-70 ribs with a penultimate whorl). The apertural margin in lateral view is oblique / and (-shaped, with an exaggerated , and a P-like opening at the suture in the last quarter of the last whorl. There is no cervical callus.  The apertural margin can be thick.

R. moutoni singularis is possibly the end of an evolutionary line that begins with an almost straight apertural margin (in lateral view) towards a much more oblique and protruded margin with the needle snail having the longest  along the suture.

References

 Bank, R. A.; Neubert, E. (2017). Checklist of the land and freshwater Gastropoda of Europe. Last update: July 16th, 2017

External links
 Pollonera, C. (1905). Note malacologiche. II. Molluschi terrestri e fluviatili delle Isole d'Elba e Pianosa. Bollettino dei Musei di Zoologia ed Anatomia Comparata della R. Università di Torino, 20 (517): 1-10, pl. 1. Torino

Renea (gastropod)
Endemic molluscs of Metropolitan France
Gastropods described in 1905
Taxonomy articles created by Polbot
Taxobox binomials not recognized by IUCN